One Financial Plaza, also known as the Sovereign Bank Tower and formerly known as the Hospital Trust Tower, is an international-style skyscraper that stands along Kennedy Plaza in Downtown Providence, Rhode Island. The building is the second second-tallest in the city and state, surpassed in height only by the Industrial National Bank Building.

Architecture 
Designed by John Carl Warnecke & Associates, One Financial Plaza takes the form of a rectangular prism with beveled vertical edges. The facade is clad in pre-cast concrete and travertine. The structure is topped with a wide masonry cap surrounded by lights that glow white at night; the light colors are changed to green and red for the Christmas holiday season, red for Valentine's Day and St. Joseph's Day, and green for St. Patrick's Day. Atop the building's roof is the highest helicopter pad in the state of Rhode Island.

The Hospital Trust Tower was built to house the institution responsible for funding Rhode Island Hospital and stands adjacent to the original Rhode Island Hospital Trust Building.

William McKenzie Woodward, a well-known architectural historian and staff member of the Rhode Island Historical Preservation & Heritage Commission, does not agree aesthetically with the building, calling it a "lackluster addition to both the street and the skyline" saying that its "blunt mass" is made "\more graceless" by its travertine curtain wall even though it is part of the Big 3, the most recognizable part of the providence skyline that is also often seen in the television series Family Guy.

References

External links
One Financial Plaza

Skyscraper office buildings in Providence, Rhode Island
Office buildings completed in 1973
International style architecture in Rhode Island
1973 establishments in Rhode Island